Notre Dame High School or Notre Dame Academy or variations are the name of numerous high (secondary) schools and other academies:

Australia
 Notre Dame College, Shepparton, Victoria

Canada
 Athol Murray College of Notre Dame, Wilcox, Saskatchewan
 Collège Notre-Dame (Sudbury), Ontario
 Collège Notre-Dame du Sacré-Cœur, Montreal, Quebec
 Notre Dame Catholic Secondary School (Ajax), Ontario
 Notre Dame Catholic Secondary School (Brampton), Ontario
 Notre Dame Catholic Secondary School (Burlington), Ontario
 Notre Dame College School, Welland, Ontario
 Notre Dame High School (Calgary), Alberta
 Notre Dame High School (Ottawa), Ontario
 Notre Dame High School (Toronto), Ontario 
 Notre Dame Regional Secondary School, Vancouver, British Columbia

France
 Notre-Dame International High School, Verneuil-sur-Seine

Ghana
 Notre Dame High School (Ghana), Fiapre, Brong-Ahafo Region

Haiti
 Collège Notre-Dame (Haiti), Cap-Haïtien

India
 Notre Dame Academy, Patna
 Notre Dame Academy, Munger
 Notre Dame Academy, Jamalpur

Philippines
 Notre Dame Institute, Aringay, La Union
 Notre Dame of Dadiangas University, General Santos City, South Cotabato
 Notre Dame of Midsayap College, Midsayap, North Cotabato
 Notre Dame University (Philippines), Cotabato City, Maguindanao
 Notre Dame of Cotabato, Inc., Cotabato City, Maguindanao
 Notre Dame – RVM College of Cotabato, Cotabato City, Maguindanao
 Notre Dame of Kidapawan College, Kidapawan City, North Cotabato

Notre Dame of Isulan , Sultan Kudarat

United Kingdom
 Lingfield College, Lingfield, Surrey, England
 Notre Dame Catholic College (Liverpool), Lancashire, England
 Notre Dame Catholic School, Plymouth, Devon, England
 Notre Dame Catholic Sixth Form College, Leeds, Yorkshire, England
 Notre Dame High School, Glasgow, Scotland
 Notre Dame High School (Norwich), Norfolk, England
 Notre Dame High School (Sheffield), Yorkshire, England
 Notre Dame School, Cobham, Surrey, England
 Notre Dame Roman Catholic Girls' School, London, England

United States

 Notre Dame Preparatory High School (Arizona)
 Notre Dame Academy (Los Angeles, California)
 Notre Dame High School (Belmont, California)
 Notre Dame High School (Riverside, California)
 Notre Dame High School (Salinas, California)
 Notre Dame High School (San Jose, California)
 Notre Dame High School (Sherman Oaks, California)
 Notre Dame Catholic High School (Connecticut) (Fairfield)
 Notre Dame High School (West Haven, Connecticut)
 Notre Dame Academy (Miami, Florida), merged in 1981 into Archbishop Curley-Notre Dame High School
 Notre Dame Academy (Georgia), Duluth, Georgia
 Notre Dame High School for Girls, Chicago, Illinois, closed in 2016
 Notre Dame College Prep, Niles, Illinois, formerly Notre Dame High School for Boys
 Peoria Notre Dame High School, Peoria, Illinois
 Quincy Notre Dame High School, Quincy, Illinois
 Notre Dame High School (Burlington, Iowa)
 Notre Dame Academy (Park Hills, Kentucky)
 Notre Dame High School (Crowley, Louisiana)
 Institute of Notre Dame, Baltimore, Maryland
 Notre Dame Preparatory School (Towson, Maryland)
 Notre Dame Preparatory School (Fitchburg, Massachusetts)
 Notre Dame Academy (Hingham, Massachusetts)
 Notre Dame Cristo Rey High School, Methuen, Massachusetts
 Notre Dame Academy (Worcester, Massachusetts)
 Notre Dame High School (Harper Woods, Michigan) (closed in 2005)
 Notre Dame Preparatory (Pontiac, Michigan)
 Notre Dame High School (Biloxi, Mississippi): see Mercy Cross High School (Biloxi, Mississippi)
 Notre Dame High School (Cape Girardeau, Missouri)
 Notre Dame High School (St. Louis), Missouri
 Notre Dame High School (New Jersey) (Lawrenceville)
 Notre Dame High School (Batavia, New York)
 Notre Dame High School (Elmira, New York)
 Notre Dame School (Manhattan), New York, New York
 Notre Dame Academy (Staten Island), New York, New York
 Notre Dame Junior Senior High School (Utica, New York)
 Notre Dame-Cathedral Latin School, Chardon, Ohio
 Notre Dame High School (Hamilton, Ohio)
 Notre Dame High School (Portsmouth, Ohio)
 Notre Dame Academy (Toledo, Ohio)
 Notre Dame High School (East Stroudsburg, Pennsylvania)
 Notre Dame High School (Easton, Pennsylvania), Easton, Pennsylvania
 Notre Dame Academy, Mitchell, South Dakota, of NRHP-listed Holy Family Church, School, and Rectory
 Notre Dame High School (Chattanooga, Tennessee)
 Notre Dame School of Dallas, Texas
 Notre Dame Catholic School (Wichita Falls, Texas)
 Notre Dame Academy (Middleburg, Virginia) (became Middleburg Academy in 2010)
 Notre Dame High School (Clarksburg, West Virginia)
 Notre Dame Academy (Green Bay, Wisconsin)

Guam
 Notre Dame High School (Guam), Talofofo

Puerto Rico
 Colegio Católico Notre Dame, Caguas

See also
 Notre Dame (disambiguation)
 Our Lady (disambiguation)